The Fifty-fourth Oklahoma Legislature was the meeting of the legislative branch of the government of Oklahoma  from January 8, 2013 to January 5, 2015. The first session met from February 4, 2013, to May 24, 2013, in the Oklahoma State Capitol in Oklahoma City, during the third year of the first administration of Governor Mary Fallin. After the 2012 elections, the Republican Party held more than two-thirds of the seats in the Oklahoma Senate and the Oklahoma House of Representatives.

The 2013 session resulted in an overhaul of the workers' compensation system, funding for relief and recovery efforts in response to a 2013 tornado outbreak, and employee development initiatives to improve care at veteran care centers.

Dates of sessions
Organizational day: January 8, 2013
First regular session: February 4, 2013 – May 24, 2013
First special session: September 2-6 and 9, 2013
Second regular session:  February 3, 2014 - May 30, 2014
Previous: 53rd Legislature • Next: 55th Legislature

Major legislation

Enacted
2013 Legislative Session
Budget - HB 2301 contained the state budget that began July 1, 2013 and ends July 1, 2014.
Abortion - HB 1361 requires 48-hour written notice to parents before a minor has an abortion.
Abortion - HB 2226 requires a prescription for emergency contraception to women under the age of 17. 
Criminal procedure - HB 1068 enables those convicted of violent crimes to request DNA testing of evidence.
Disaster recovery - SB 249 transfers $45 million from the constitutional reserve fund to fund relief and recovery efforts resulting from the 2013 tornado outbreak.
Education - HB 1658 revises state A-F grading system scoring.
Income tax cut - HB 2032 reduces the top income tax rate from 5.25 percent to 5 percent on 2015 and sets up a mechanism to cut the rate to 4.85 percent in 2016 if the total revenue growth in the 2016 fiscal year is equal to or greater than the fiscal impact of the 0.15 percent tax cut; funds Capitol repairs.
Ruled unconstitutional by Oklahoma Supreme Court
Infrastructure planning - HB 1910 forms Long-Range Capital Planning Commission with goals to repair the Oklahoma State Capitol and develop an eight-year plan to address the maintenance of state assets.
Smoking - SB 501 gives municipalities and counties the right to ban smoking on government property and makes state property smoke-free.
Workers' compensation - SB 1062 moves the state from a court-based workers’ compensation system to an administrative system, allowing for more timely processing of claims and reducing the adversarial nature of the process for both workers and employers.
Veteran care - SB 228 creates employee development initiatives at veteran care centers to improve care.
Government reform - HB 2201 privatizes CompSource Oklahoma, an agency which provides workers' compensation insurance to private business, into a private insurance company
Drugs - HB 1783 prohibits automatic refills on products containing hydrocodone
Welfare reform - SB 887 prevents those convicted of illegally transferring food stamp benefits from enrollment in the program
Public safety - HB 1871 grants federally-recognized Indian tribes' law enforcement agencies the power to enforce state law

2013 Special Session
Lawsuit reform - SB 1x provides for an affidavit of merit for negligence lawsuits that are required to include expert testimony if necessary for the case.

2014 Legislative Session
Budget - SB 2127 contained the state budget that begins July 1, 2014 and ends July 1, 2015.
Abortion - HB 2684 bans the off-label use of the drug RU486. The drug is used during the first seven weeks of a pregnancy to induce an abortion. 
Education - HB 2625 modifies the Reading Sufficiency Act by allowing a student reading proficiency team to recommend promotion for a student who fails a reading test. The district superintendent would ultimately decide to promote or retain the student based on their recommendation. The legislation would also allow students to use a screening assessment at any point prior to the third-grade reading test to qualify for promotion.
Income tax cut - SB 1246 gradually lowers Oklahoma’s top income tax rate from 5.25 percent to 4.85 percent over several years, if general revenue increases during that time. Under the legislation, the top personal income tax rate will fall to 5 percent in Fiscal Year 2016 or later when state revenue projects are greater than projections in the previous year. The rate will further fall to 4.85 percent at a minimum of two years after the first cut, if revenue increases again.
Pension reform - HB 2630 switches new state employees who participate in the Oklahoma Public Employees Retirement System to a 401(k)-style defined contribution plan.  Under the new plan, workers contribute between 3 and 7 percent of their salaries into the retirement system and receive a dollar-for-dollar match from the state.  Participants can become 20 percent vested in the retirement system after one year and are completely vested after 5 years.  Employees could also leave their jobs and receive their contributions back plus a percentage of the state’s contribution.  The defined-contribution system would take effect Nov. 1, 2015.

Failed
Insure Oklahoma - SB 700 would have redirected $50 million on state tobacco tax money to fund Insure Oklahoma program, which provides insurance for low-income Oklahomans.
Trooper pay raise - HB 2145 would have given Oklahoma Highway Patrol troopers a 16 percent pay raise.

Leadership

Since the Republican Party holds the majority of seats in both the Oklahoma Senate and Oklahoma House of Representatives, they hold the top leadership positions in both chambers.

In Oklahoma, the lieutenant governor serves as President of the Oklahoma Senate, meaning that he serves as the presiding officer in ceremonial instances and can provide a tie-breaking vote. Todd Lamb serves as the current Lieutenant Governor of Oklahoma. The current President pro tempore of the Oklahoma Senate, who presides over the state senate on the majority of session days is Brian Bingman. He is aided by Majority Floor Leader Mike Schulz and Majority Whip Rick Brinkley. The Democratic Minority leader of the state senate is Sean Burrage. Paul Ziriax serves as the Secretary of the Oklahoma Senate.

The first session of the legislature was led by Speaker T.W. Shannon. Jeff W. Hickman succeeded Shannon on February 10, 2014. Speaker Pro Tempore was Mike Jackson, Majority leaders were Fred Jordan and Dennis Johnson, Majority Floor Leader was Pam Peterson and Majority Whip was Todd Thomsen. The chair of the Republican caucus is Weldon Watson The Democratic Minority leader is Scott Inman. Joel Kintsel serves as Chief Clerk of the Oklahoma House of Representatives. Rick Rose serves as Chief of Staff of the House and Special Counsel to the Speaker.

Membership

Senate

House of Representatives

References

External links
 Oklahoma Legislature Homepage
 State of Oklahoma's Website
 Legislative Bill Tracking Website

Oklahoma legislative sessions
2013 in Oklahoma
2014 in Oklahoma
2013 U.S. legislative sessions
2014 U.S. legislative sessions